PT PAL Indonesia (Persero) is an Indonesian state-owned enterprise that manufactures ships for military and civilian use and conducts repairs and maintenance on ships and engineering.

History
PT PAL Indonesia (Persero) was established in 1939 as Marine Establishment (ME) by the Dutch East Indies government. During the Japanese occupation, ME was renamed as Kaigun SE 2124. After Indonesia gained independence, the company was nationalized with the company name changed to Penataran Angkatan Laut (PAL).

On April 15, 1980, the company's status was changed from a Public Company (Perusahaan Umum) to a Limited Company (Perseroan Terbatas) according to notary deed No.12 of Hadi Moentoro, SH. The deed also states that PAL is no longer bears "Penataran Angkatan Laut", thus the name PAL is standalone. The change of status officially marked as the founding date of PT PAL Indonesia (Persero). 

The Philippine Navy ordered its first landing platform/dock-type ship with the  being made by PT PAL on June 5, 2015, with the ship commissioned into service on June 1, 2016. The contract was around $USD92 million.

A MoU agreement was signed between PT PAL and Boustead Naval Shipyard to have the Malaysian Navy's first LPD ship constructed in Surabaya on November 6, 2016.

On February 23, 2017, PT PAL has signed an agreement with two UAE shipbuilding companies Abu Dhabi Ship Building (ADSB) and the International Global Group (IGG) in order to boost its presence in the Middle East with the agreement during the 2017 IDEX convention.

On April 15, 2017, an agreement was signed between DCNS and PT PAL to collaborate on building new submarines, corvettes and frigates.

On July 14, 2017, PT PAL has reported that other countries in Africa and Asia have sought orders to create ships for their navies, among them Malaysia, Nigeria, Senegal, Guinea-Bissau and Gabon. Among other orders made by the African countries included Nigeria's order for one SSV; Senegal for one LPD ship along with two Clurit class fast attack craft, KCR-35 meter ships and three KCR-60 meter ships and Guinea-Bissau and Gabon for one KCR-60 meter ship each as of July 18, 2017.

On July 1, 2020, PT PAL was in talks with the United Arab Emirates for a landing platform dock-type ship. On July 4, 2022, PT PAL signed an agreement with the United Arab Emirates to construct a landing platform dock-type ship for the UAE Navy.

Products

Warship
 Chang Bogo-class submarine/Nagapasa-class submarine (First Indonesian joint section built submarine)
 Makassar-class landing platform dock/Tarlac-class landing platform dock

 Martadinata-class frigate

Fast patrol craft 14 Meter
Fast patrol craft 28 Meter
Fast patrol craft 38 Meter
Fast patrol ship 57 meter
Missile-equipped Fast Patrol Boat (Indonesian: Kapal Cepat Rudal) Sampari class 60 meter
Fast patrol craft 15 Meter
PAL Motor Yacht 28 meter

Tanker and cargo ship
OHBC 45.000 DWT STAR
OHBC 45.000 DWT
STAR 50 – BSBC 50.000 DWT
STAR 50 – DSBC 50.000 DWT
Cargo Vessel 3.500 DWT
Cargo Vessel 3650 DWT
Container Ship 1.600 TEU'S
Container Ship 400 TEU'S
Container Vessel 4.180 DWT
Dry Cargo Vessel 18.500 DWT
PAX-500
Tanker 17.500 LTDW
Tanker 24.000 LTDW
Tanker 30.000 LTDW
Tanker 3.500 LTDW
Tanker 6.500 LTDW
General Engineering

 Barge Mounted Power Plant
 INA-TEWS (Tsunami Early Warning System)

References

External links
 

Defense companies of Indonesia
Government-owned companies of Indonesia
Indonesian brands
1939 establishments in the Dutch East Indies
Shipbuilding companies of Indonesia
Companies based in Surabaya